Justice Holmes may refer to:

 Andrew O. Holmes (1906–1965), associate justice of the Tennessee Supreme Court
 Catherine Holmes (born 1956), justice of the Supreme Court of Queensland, Australia
 Oliver Wendell Holmes Jr. (1841–1935), associate justice of the United States Supreme Court from 1902 to 1932
 Richard Winn Holmes (1923–1999), associate justice of the Kansas Supreme Court
 Robert E. Holmes (1922–2004), associate justice of the Ohio Supreme Court